Jean-Julien Rojer (born 25 August 1981) is a Dutch professional tennis player from Curaçao, who specialises in doubles. He reached his career-high doubles ranking of world No. 3 in November 2015.

He is a four-time Grand Slam champion, having won 2015 Wimbledon and 2017 US Open with Horia Tecău, the 2022 French Open with Marcelo Arévalo in men's doubles, as well as the 2014 French Open in mixed doubles alongside Anna-Lena Grönefeld. By winning the 2022 French Open, Rojer became the oldest major men's doubles champion in the Open Era. He has won 35 doubles titles on the ATP Tour, including the 2015 ATP World Tour Finals and three at Masters 1000 level.

He attended UCLA where he competed for the UCLA Bruins men's tennis team. Since 2012, Rojer has represented the Netherlands in the Davis Cup, having previously represented the Netherlands Antilles from 1999 to 2010. He has also competed at the Olympic Games on three occasions.

World TeamTennis
Rojer has played four seasons with World TeamTennis, making his debut in 2011 with the St. Louis Aces and earning the 2011 WTT Male Rookie of the Year award. He has since played for the Springfield Lasers in 2013, earning the 2013 WTT Male MVP award, and another two seasons in 2017 and 2019.  It was announced he will be joining the Springfield Lasers during the 2020 WTT season set to begin July 12.

Significant finals

Grand Slam finals

Doubles: 3 (3 titles)

Mixed doubles: 1 (1 title)

Year-end championships

Doubles: 1 (1 title)

Masters 1000 finals

Doubles: 6 (3 titles, 3 runners-up)

ATP career finals

Doubles: 58 (35 titles, 23 runner-ups)

Doubles performance timeline

Current through the 2023 Mexican Open.

Notes

References

External links

 
 
 

1981 births
Living people
Dutch Antillean male tennis players
Dutch male tennis players
Curaçao male tennis players
French Open champions
Wimbledon champions
US Open (tennis) champions
Tennis players at the 2012 Summer Olympics
Tennis players at the 2016 Summer Olympics
Olympic tennis players of the Netherlands
Grand Slam (tennis) champions in men's doubles
Grand Slam (tennis) champions in mixed doubles
People from Willemstad
Tennis players at the 2020 Summer Olympics
UCLA Bruins men's tennis players
ITF World Champions